Slutty Vegan is a vegan hamburger restaurant chain, based in Atlanta, Georgia.

History 
Pinky Cole, a former television producer, founded the restaurant in August 2018. She intended for it to be a ghost kitchen, where customers would order food online and use a delivery service to get it. Cole started the restaurant because she found that there was no place available to eat vegan food after 9 p.m. She decided to use sex as a theme for her restaurant because of its ability to attract non-vegan customers. Social media and word-of-mouth was used heavily to promote the restaurant.

It originally started in a shared kitchen, before moving to a food truck several weeks later, and later moved to a brick-and-mortar location in Westview on January 13, 2019. Two locations were opened in the Atlanta area in 2020. The restaurant is known for its growth despite the ongoing COVID-19 pandemic. The chain has collaborated with Shake Shack to release plant-based burgers that were available for only one day. 

As of January 2023 there is a pending lawsuit over loss wages from an ex-employee.

Locations 

As of January 2022, the chain has four locations in the Metro Atlanta area and a plant-based bar, Bar Vegan. There are plans to open restaurants in Athens and Columbus, Georgia, Birmingham, Alabama, and Brooklyn and Harlem in New York City. There are also plans to open a new location once every month in 2022, in a different city.

The chain has a mobile food truck, which hosts pop-ups at various locations in the South.

See also
 List of Black-owned restaurants

Black-owned restaurants in the United States

References 

Vegan restaurants in the United States
2018 establishments in Georgia (U.S. state)
Restaurants in Atlanta